Big Soup is a studio album by English electronic musician Luke Vibert. His first non-collaborative studio album under his own name, it was released on 7 July 1997 by Mo' Wax.

Musical style
Fact characterised Luke Vibert's production style on Big Soup as "sitting somewhere in between the sample-rich collages of DJ Shadow and the tight, precise constructions of DJ Krush and Major Force." Andy Kellman of AllMusic described Big Soup as an album of instrumental hip hop music.

Release
Big Soup was released on 7 July 1997 by Mo' Wax. The sleeve artwork for the album was designed by Ben Drury.

In the United States, Big Soup was issued by Mo' Wax and FFRR Records. It garnered airplay on American college radio, entering the CMJ Top 200 chart.

Critical reception

In 2015, Fact ranked Big Soup at number five on its list of the best trip hop albums of all time.

Track listing

Charts

References

External links
 

1997 albums
Luke Vibert albums
Mo' Wax albums
FFRR Records albums